The 2015 Women's Indoor Asia Cup was the 5th edition of the Women's Indoor Hockey Asia Cup. It was held in Nakhon Ratchasima, Thailand from 12 to 16 August 2015.

The number of teams for this year's cup had increased by one compared to the previous tournament where four teams competed. Malaysia and Tajikistan, who competed previously, not joined this year's edition and be replaced by Cambodia, Hong Kong and Uzbekistan.

Kazakhstan defeated Thailand in the final to win the cup.

Participating nations
Five countries participated in this year's tournament:

 (Host)

Umpires

 Emily Carroll (AUS)
 Annie Thomas (MAS)
 Chan Ching Man (HKG)
 Thanitta Chuangmanichot (THA)
 Amina Dussembekova (KAZ)
 Ornpimol Kittiteerasopon (THA)

Results
All times are in Thailand Standard Time (UTC+07:00).

Pool

Classification round

Third place game

Final

Final standings

See also
2015 Men's Indoor Hockey Asia Cup

References

External links
FIH

Indoor Hockey Asia Cup Women
Women's Indoor Hockey Asia Cup
Indoor Hockey Asia Cup
International women's field hockey competitions hosted by Thailand
Indoor Hockey Asia Cup Women
Asia Cup